Hege Hansen (born 24 October 1990) is a Norwegian footballer who plays for Klepp IL in the Norwegian First Division.

Career
Hansen played from 2006 to 2010 for the Toppserien club Klepp IL. In August 2010, she switched to Arna-Bjørnar and her first match for new club, was against her old club. After five seasons, she returned to Klepp IL for 2015 season.

International career
Hansen was in several Norwegian junior teams. In autumn 2007, she was part of the U-19 team that qualified and reached the final in the 2008 UEFA Women's Under-19 Championship in France. They were runners-up, after losing to Italy, for the minimum score, 1:0. She also participated in the team that played the 2009 UEFA Women's Under-19 Championship. Norway qualified for the final tournament, but was unable to surpass the group stage and only scored once. In February 2009, she played two matches for the U-23 team in La Manga, Spain. Three years later, on 17 January 2012 – also in La Manga – she played her first game for the senior team. On 14 May 2015, she was nominated for the final squad for the 2015 FIFA Women's World Cup.

Family 
Her father Hugo Hansen and her brother Cato Hansen were both professional footballers. Her sister, Tuva Hansen, is also a professional footballer.

References

External links
 Team`s Player profile
 Eurosport Player profile
 NFF Player Profile

1990 births
Living people
People from Time, Norway
Women's association football forwards
Klepp IL players
Arna-Bjørnar players
Avaldsnes IL players
Toppserien players
2015 FIFA Women's World Cup players
Norway women's international footballers
Norwegian women's footballers
Sportspeople from Rogaland